Oxystele merula is a species of sea snail, a marine gastropod mollusk in the family Trochidae, the top snails.

Description
The height of the shell varies between 27 mm and 40 mm, its diameter between 35 mm and 41 mm. The rather depressed conoidal shell is imperforate. Its color is lusterless purplish-black. The conical spire has an eroded yellowish apex. The following whorl is spirally striate. The last two whorls are smooth. The six whorls are convex. The sutures are distinct. The body whorl is not carinated at the periphery, rather flattened on the base, and usually slightly eroded in front of the aperture. The large aperture is oblique. The outer lip has a black margin and is within silvery. The nacre is smooth, but apparently lirate.  The thin, white columella is arcuate and simple. The umbilico-columellar region is surrounded by a beautiful rose-colored tract.

Distribution
This marine species occurs in the Atlantic Ocean off Angola,  Namibia and the Cape Region, South Africa.

References

 Contributions to the knowledge of South African marine Mollusca; Annals of The South African Museum vol. 47; 1963

External links
  G.B. Sowerby (1892), Marine shells of South Africa: a catalogue of all the known species
  AJH Goodwin; Archaeology of the Oakhurst Shelter, George: Part VI. Stratified Deposits and Contents; Transactions of the Royal Society of South Africa, 1937

merula
Gastropods described in 1817